Igor Vysochansky is a retired Ukrainian footballer who played as a midfielder.

Career
Igor Vysochansky started his career in 1992 for two season with Halychyna Drohobych then he moved to Volyn Lutsk. In 1993 he played 11 matches with Zirka Kropyvnytskyi and 58 matches with Lviv and 12 Systema-Boreks. In 1997 he moved to Desna Chernihiv, the main club of Chernihiv where he played 18 matches and scored 1 goal. In 199 he played 18 matches with Reformatsiya Abakan and 12 matches with Hazovyk Komarno, then he returned to Russia for two seasons where he played 74 matches and scored 8 goals with Dynamo Kirov.

References

External links 
 Igor Vysochansky footballfacts.ru
 Igor Vysochansky allplayers.in.ua

1968 births
Living people
FC Desna Chernihiv players
FC Volyn Lutsk players
FC Zirka Kropyvnytskyi players
FC Lviv players
FC Systema-Boreks Borodianka players
FC Hazovyk Komarno players
FC Dynamo Kirov players
Ukrainian footballers
Ukrainian Premier League players
Ukrainian First League players
Ukrainian Second League players
Association football midfielders
Ukrainian expatriate sportspeople in Russia
Expatriate footballers in Russia